is a small island in Ishinomaki, Miyagi Prefecture, Japan. It lies in the Pacific Ocean off the Oshika Peninsula, to the north of Aji Island. It is an inhabited island, although the population is quite small (around 80 people , compared to around 1,000 people in the 1950s). It has become known as "Cat Island" owing to its large stray cat population that thrives as a result of the local belief that feeding cats will bring wealth and good fortune. The cat population is now larger than the human population on the island. There are no pet dogs on the island due to the large cat population.

The island is divided into two villages/ports: Oodomari and Nitoda. The neighboring Aji Island used to belong to the town of Oshika, while Tashirojima was a part of the city of Ishinomaki. On April 1, 2005, Oshika merged with Ishinomaki, so now both islands are a part of Ishinomaki.

The majority of the people who live on the island are involved either in fishing or hospitality.

The island is also known as Manga Island, as  Shotaro Ishinomori planned to move to the island shortly before his death. There are manga-themed lodges on the island, resembling cats.

History 
In Japan's late Edo period, much of the island raised silkworms for their textiles. The residents kept cats to chase the mice away from their precious silkworms. In 1602, all pet cats in Japan were freed by decree to counter the rampant rodent population that threatened the silkworm industry. The release of Tashirojima's pet cats is what created the island's thriving wild population.

Tashiro Elementary School closed down in 1989 and was turned into an educational center. The educational center closed in 2008. Manga Island, a tourist facility, was built in 2000. A  and  race called Hyokkori Hyōtan Tashirojima Marathon was held in 2007.

In 2011, the island was hit by the Tōhoku tsunami, which destroyed the harbor and caused the ground to subside, leaving the villages more exposed to both flooding during high tides and strong coastal winds. The local cat population fled inland to escape the tsunami, and only a portion returned to the villages in the aftermath. The tsunami also caused an outbreak of parva in the region, and at least 80 cats on Tashirojima were captured and vaccinated in a matter of days to forestall the disease. Due to the loss of the harbor, which was used primarily by a ferry service and Tashirojima's small fishing industry, a number of fishers and their families moved away.

By 2015, government workers had rebuilt much of the harbor to raise the coastline and stop the floods, but the island's fishing industry remained diminished. However, tourism was steady, and at least two regular visitors to the island had taken up residence there.

Feline population 
By 2015, the human population numbered around 80, while the total cat population exceeded that by several hundred, with at least 150 cats permanently residing in one of the villages. A vet traveled to the island every two months to examine the village-dwelling cats. While the cat population is mostly made up of crossbreeds and mixed-breed cats, one distinct breed commonly seen on the island is the Japanese Bobtail.

In Japanese culture, cats are considered to bring good luck, said to bring money and good fortune to all who cross their path. Some even claim that it was the cats who kept the majority of the island from being destroyed during the Tohoku earthquake and tsunami in 2011.

Cat shrine 

In the past, the islanders raised silkworms for silk, and cats were kept in order to keep the mouse population down (because mice are a natural predator of silkworms). Fixed-net fishing was commonly practiced on the island after the Edo period, and fishers from other areas would come and stay on the island overnight. The cats would go to the inns where the fishers were staying and beg for scraps. Over time, the fishers developed a fondness for the cats and would observe the cats closely, interpreting their actions as predictions of the weather and fish patterns. One day, when the fishers were collecting rocks to use with the fixed-nets, a stray rock fell and killed one of the cats. The fishers, feeling sorry for the loss of the cat, buried it and enshrined it at this location on the island.

There are at least ten cat shrines in Miyagi Prefecture. There are also 51 stone monuments in the shape of cats, which is an unusually high number compared to the other prefectures. In particular, these shrines and monuments are concentrated in the southern area of the island, overlapping with the regions where silkworms were raised.

Mentions in media 
In 2004, a couple moved to the island from Sendai and opened up an inn for travelers called Hamaya. In 2006, they started a blog about the island and its inhabitants. The movie was spun off into a series, the latest one of which Nyanko the Movie 4 was released in July 2010. Each installed has included an update on Jack. As a result, many cat lovers come to the island and package tours specifically to "look for Jack" are now available. Cat photo contests and exhibitions are now held on the island.

In 2012, the BBC in the UK presented a short television series called Pets – Wild at Heart, which features the behaviours of pets, including the cats on the island.

In 2015, Landon Donoho, an independent filmmaker, crowd-funded the production of a documentary titled Cat Heaven Island. It follows the stories of the inhabitants of the island, both old and new, human and feline.

Local products 
 Oysters
 Abalone

Access 
 40 minutes on the Ajishima Line (ferry).

See also 
 Aoshima, Ehime, another "Cat Island" in Japan
 Ōkunoshima, often called "" ("Rabbit Island") because of the numerous feral rabbits that roam the island

References

External links 

 

Islands of Miyagi Prefecture
Ishinomaki
Cats in Japan